Hussawee Pakrapongpisan (born 21 August 1997) nicknamed Kem (เข้ม) is a Thai actor and model. He is currently signed under Channel 7. He is best known for his roles in television dramas such as Jao Saming (2018), Hua Jai Look Poochai (2019), Tawan Arb Dao (2020), and So Wayree (2020).

Early life 
Pakrapongpisan was born on August 21, 1997, in Bueng Kan. He graduated from high school in Bueng Kan and on January 21, 2023, he graduated and earned a bachelor's degree in the Faculty of Communication Arts at Dhurakij Pundit University.

Career 
Pakrapongpisan started his career in the entertainment industry as a model. In 2017, he makes his debuted as an actor and signed an exclusive contract with Channel 7. His first lead role was in Hi-So Sa Orn, an evening drama in 2018. In that same year, his first prime-time drama was Jao Saming. In 2020, Pakrapongpisan popularity grow even bigger after paired with Mookda Narinrak in a drama So Wayree.

Filmography

Film

Dramas

Music video appearances

Awards and nominations

References

External links
 
 

1997 births
Living people
Hussawee Pakrapongpisan
Hussawee Pakrapongpisan
Hussawee Pakrapongpisan
Hussawee Pakrapongpisan